is a private university in Taito, Tokyo, Japan, specialising in music. It was established in 1958. Its predecessor was a school for young women founded in 1904.

One of the university's most prominent alumni is pianist Nobuyuki Tsujii, gold medalist of the 2009 Thirteenth Van Cliburn International Piano Competition.  Tsujii entered the university's Performance Program in April 2007, and graduated in March, 2011.

External links
 Official website 

Educational institutions established in 1904
Private universities and colleges in Japan
Universities and colleges in Tokyo
1904 establishments in Japan